Helen Spivey is an American environmentalist and former member of the Florida House of Representatives. She grew up in New Jersey. In 1972 she moved to Crystal River, Florida. She has been an advocate for manatees. She is a Democrat.

She was succeeded in the Florida House by Nancy Argenziano. She is known as the Manatee Lady. In 2011, Spivey's conservation work was recognized by the United States House of Representatives when Congresswoman Debbie Wasserman Schultz celebrated Spivey receiving the U.S. Fish and Wildlife Service’s 2010 Regional Director’s Conservation Award.

References

Democratic Party members of the Florida House of Representatives
American women environmentalists
Living people
People from Crystal River, Florida
Year of birth missing (living people)
21st-century American women